The Nihilist (2014) is the third solo album by New Zealand artist Liam Finn.

Production
The album was recorded in Brooklyn.

Critical reception
The New Zealand Herald wrote that "The Nihilist is not the album of hopelessness and negativity the title might suggest, but rather an exploration of the idea that there might be more to it all than what we see and believe." American Songwriter called it "the first album where Finn fully explores using the studio as an instrument, creating a headphones album that doesn’t shy away from the fact that it’s pulling on his skills as a producer as much as his gifts as a songwriter."

Track listing 
All songs were written by Liam Finn
 "Ocean Emmanuelle"
 "The Nihilist"
 "Snug As Fuck"
 "Helena Bonham Carter"
 "Burn Up the Road"
 "Dreary Droop"
 "Miracle Glance"
 "4 Track Stomper"
 "Arrow"
 "I"
 "Wild Animal"
 "Wrestle with Dad"

Personnel 
 Liam Finn - vocals, all instruments except noted
 Eliza-Jane Barnes - Vocals
 Elroy Finn - Drums
 Jol Mulholland - Bass, synth and vocals.
 Cecilia Herbert - Vocals
 Andrew Keoghan - Violin

Production
 Engineered by Liam Finn, Chris Boosahda and Jol Mulholland
 Mixed by Liam Finn and Andrew Everding
 Recorded at The Stud, [theend], Tarbox and Roundhead Studios

References

2014 albums
Liam Finn albums
Yep Roc Records albums
Albums recorded at Roundhead Studios